WODB-LP (90.9 FM) is a radio station broadcasting a Contemporary Christian format. Licensed to Caguas, Puerto Rico, the station serves the central Puerto Rico area. The station was a dream come true of the radio announcer Miguel A. Melendez requested in 2013 under Iglesia Refugio, Sanidad y Adoración, Inc. The Station actually 2022 is in Control dispute.

External links

2015 establishments in Puerto Rico
Radio stations established in 2015
ODB-LP
Caguas, Puerto Rico